Amrit Abhijat (born 21 June 1968) is an Indian bureaucrat, civil servant and officer in the Uttar Pradesh cadre of the Indian Administrative Service. Since December 2015, Abhijat has served as Joint Secretary and Mission Director in the Ministry of Housing and Urban Affairs in the Government of India.

References

1968 births
Living people
People from Bihar
Indian Administrative Service officers